The invariant factors of a module over a principal ideal domain (PID) occur in one form of the structure theorem for finitely generated modules over a principal ideal domain.

If  is a PID and  a finitely generated -module, then

The invariant factors of a matrix over a PID occur in the Smith normal form and provide a means of computing the structure of a module from a set of generators and relations.

See also
 Elementary divisors

References
   Chap.8, p.128.
 Chapter III.7, p.153 of 

Module theory